Buzy was a Japanese female pop music group, made up of members Nao Tōyama, Mayumi Niwa, Mao Miyazato, Yurisa Asama, Sachiko Iwanaga and Yumi Takeda. The group originally formed in 1998 as COLOR and consisted of Tōyama, Miyazato, Niwa, and Komugi Kadota, and released five singles and two albums between 1999 and 2001. As Buzy, they released their first single "Kujira" in 2004. They are well known for the song "Be Somewhere", used as the opening theme of the anime series Rockman EXE Stream, back in 2005. They also performed the opening theme song for Twin Spica, "Venus Say", a version of "Kujira" with different lyrics. The group's name stands for "Blend, Unique, Zipping, and You just wait." Many of their songs were written and composed by Porno Graffitti guitarist and lyricist Haruichi Shindō. Buzy disbanded in June 2006. Members Nao, Mayumi and Mao went on to form MANSAKU with former Boystyle members Kayoko and Yukina.

Members 
 
 
 
  (left in 2002)

Discography

Singles 

 2004.03.03 - ""
 2004.07.07 - ""
 2005.01.26 - "Be Somewhere"
 2005.11.09 - ""

Albums 
 Buzy (January 25, 2006)
 Kujira (鯨)
 Hitori Ichizu (一人一途)
 Your Love is My Love (あなたを愛す私を愛す)
 Cosmos no Saku Koro ni (コスモスの咲く頃に)
 Passion (パシオン)
 Remake (リメイク)
 Shiroi Jitensha (白い自転車)
 Keep Silence
 Be Somewhere 
 Rav & Business
 Buzy
 Ashita Hare Retara (アシタ晴レタラ)
 [HIDDEN TRACK] >> [Annani Anoko no Koto wo Omotteru Yatsu wa Inakatta] ([あんなにあのコの事を想ってる奴はいなかった]) by NAO

External links 
  
 Official Web Site by Amuse 
 
 
 
 
 
 
 
 
 
 

Japanese idol groups
Japanese girl groups
Japanese pop music groups
Musical groups established in 2004
Musical groups disestablished in 2006
2004 establishments in Japan
2006 disestablishments in Japan